Antti Hermanni Ruuskanen (born 21 February 1984) is a retired Finnish track and field athlete who competes in the javelin throw. He is a European Champion, having won gold in 2014. His personal best is 88.98 m, which he set in 2015.

Career
He won the bronze medal at the 2003 European Junior Championships and the silver medal at the 2005 European U23 Championships. He was sixth at the 2009 World Championships in Berlin.

He finished third in London Olympics 2012, but after Oleksandr Pyatnytsya was disqualified as he failed a subsequent doping test, Ruuskanen moved to second place. He received his silver medal in February 2017 during a special ceremony at the 2017 World Nordic Ski Championships in Lahti from the IOC president Thomas Bach.

In 2013 he finished fifth at the World Championships in Moscow.

In 2014 he won the gold medal at the Europeans with a mark of 88.01m, beating Vítězslav Veselý (84.79m) and Tero Pitkämäki (84.40m).
 
In 2016 he won the bronze medal at the Europeans. He competed for Finland at the 2016 Summer Olympics where he placed 6th with a throw of 83.05 metres. He was the flag bearer for Finland during the closing ceremony.

Ruuskanen is a substitute thrower for Finland at the 2020 Summer Olympics.

Competition record

Seasonal bests by year
2002 - 66.08
2003 - 72.87
2004 - 75.84
2005 - 79.75
2006 - 84.10
2007 - 82.71
2008 - 87.33
2009 - 85.39
2010 - 83.45
2011 - 82.29
2012 - 87.79
2013 - 85.70
2014 - 88.01
2015 - 88.98
2016 - 88.23

References

External links

Antti Ruuskanen's profile in Tilastopaja
Antti Ruuskanen's official site

1984 births
Living people
People from Pielavesi
Finnish male javelin throwers
Athletes (track and field) at the 2012 Summer Olympics
Athletes (track and field) at the 2016 Summer Olympics
Olympic athletes of Finland
Olympic silver medalists for Finland
Medalists at the 2012 Summer Olympics
European Athletics Championships medalists
World Athletics Championships athletes for Finland
Olympic silver medalists in athletics (track and field)
Sportspeople from North Savo
20th-century Finnish people
21st-century Finnish people